Sydney Chisholm Bennett (February 2, 1895 – December 30, 1971) was an American football player in the National Football League. He first played with the Chicago Tigers during the 1920 NFL season. After a year away from the NFL, he played with the Milwaukee Badgers during the 1922 NFL season.

References

1895 births
1971 deaths
American football tackles
Chicago Tigers players
Milwaukee Badgers players
Northwestern Wildcats football players
Players of American football from Illinois
Sportspeople from Kane County, Illinois
People from Geneva, Illinois